Tiúba may refer to:

Tiúba River in Brazil
Melipona compressipes, a species of stingless bee commonly known as tiúba in Brazil